Leo Francis (4 December 1922 – 13 December 2003) was an Australian rules footballer who played with North Melbourne in the Victorian Football League (VFL).

Francis came to North Melbourne from Bendigo CYMS. In 1945, his debut season, Francis was a member of the North Melbourne team which contested the VFL finals for the first time in their history. A wingman, Francis missed the 1950 VFL Grand Final with a knee injury.

Later in the 1950s he was captain-coach of Sandhurst in the Bendigo Football League.

He was the uncle of Peter Francis, who played for four VFL clubs.

References

1922 births
Australian rules footballers from Victoria (Australia)
North Melbourne Football Club players
Sandhurst Football Club players
Sportspeople from Bendigo
2003 deaths